Bojan Knežević (born 13 April 1989) is a Serbian footballer who plays as a goalkeeper.

Club career
Knežević was signed by Spartak Trnava in February 2014 and made his league debut on 1 March 2014 against Nitra.

Ahead of the 2019-20 season, Knežević joined FK Železničar Pančevo.

References

1989 births
Living people
Footballers from Belgrade
Association football goalkeepers
Serbian footballers
Serbian expatriate footballers
FC Spartak Trnava players
FK Sopot players
FK Zemun players
FK Mladost Apatin players
FK Radnički Nova Pazova players
FK Inđija players
FK Budućnost Dobanovci players
Slovak Super Liga players
Uzbekistan Super League players
Serbian First League players
Serbian expatriate sportspeople in Slovakia
Serbian expatriate sportspeople in Uzbekistan
Expatriate footballers in Slovakia
Expatriate footballers in Uzbekistan